Pat O'Connor (20 January 1881 – 12 January 1956) was an  Australian rules footballer who played with St Kilda in the Victorian Football League (VFL).

Notes

External links 

1881 births
1956 deaths
Australian rules footballers from Victoria (Australia)
St Kilda Football Club players